Herbert Francis Lister (4th Oct 1939 – July 2007) was an English professional footballer who played as a centre-forward.

He began his career with Manchester City before signing for Oldham Athletic where he made 153 appearances. He later signed for Rochdale, making 56 appearances and scoring 16 goals. He later played for Stockport County and Altrincham.

Personal life
After retiring from football he ran a newsagents and post office, as well as working as a taxi driver.

References

1939 births
2007 deaths
English footballers
Manchester City F.C. players
Oldham Athletic A.F.C. players
Rochdale A.F.C. players
People from Miles Platting
Association football forwards